Manayunk station is a station located along the SEPTA Manayunk/Norristown rail line. It is located at Cresson and Carson Streets in the Manayunk neighborhood of northwest Philadelphia, Pennsylvania. In FY 2013, Manayunk station had a weekday average of 654 boardings and 563 alightings.

History
The original Manayunk station was built by the Philadelphia, Germantown and Norristown Railroad (PG&N) in 1834, a predecessor of Reading Railroad (RDG). It was located on Green Lane near the corner of Main Street.

When the Pennsylvania Railroad (PRR) built the Schuylkill Branch they also built their own Manayunk station at the foot of the massive Pencoyd Viaduct (on the corner of Dupont and High Streets). After SEPTA was formed by the combination of RDG and PRR, this station was designated West Manayunk, and then Manayunk West, a station on the Cynwyd Line, until May 1986 when the line was cut back to its present terminus.

Following the construction of PRR's Manayunk station, the Philadelphia & Reading Railway (RDG) demolished their own station, in 1884, and replaced it with a new station at the intersection of Cresson and Roxborough Streets. This third Manayunk Station was built at street level, much like the original station and the nearby competition.

The fourth and current station was built by RDG in 1930 as part of a grade-separation project which eliminated running down the middle of Cresson Street. Despite the station building's suboptimal passenger location on the outbound side (going away from Center City Philadelphia), it is open for ticket sales on weekday mornings.

The line near Manayunk station serves as part of the border for the Manayunk Main Street Historic District, which has been on the National Register of Historic Places since 1993.

Station layout

References

External links

SEPTA – Manayunk Station (Official site)
 Gay Street entrance from Google Maps Street View

SEPTA Regional Rail stations
Former Reading Company stations